Jürgen Groh (born 17 July 1956) is a German former professional footballer who played as a defender. He spent 12 seasons in the Bundesliga with Hamburger SV and 1. FC Kaiserslautern. He represented Germany in two friendlies.

Honours
Hamburger SV
 European Cup: 1982–83
 UEFA Cup finalist: 1981–82
 Bundesliga: 1981–82, 1982–83

References

External links
 
 

1956 births
Living people
German footballers
Association football midfielders
Germany international footballers
Germany B international footballers
Olympic footballers of West Germany
West German footballers
Footballers at the 1984 Summer Olympics
Bundesliga players
Süper Lig players
1. FC Kaiserslautern players
Hamburger SV players
Trabzonspor footballers
VfR Bürstadt players
West German expatriate footballers
West German expatriate sportspeople in Turkey
Expatriate footballers in Turkey